Ken Genser (November 11, 1950 – January 9, 2010) was mayor of Santa Monica, California, until he died in office. Genser also served on the Santa Monica City Council.

Notes

Mayors of Santa Monica, California
California city council members
1950 births
2010 deaths